Kuchaluy-e Olya (also Romanized as Kūchalūy-e ‘Olyā; also known as Kachū-ye Bālā and Kachū-ye ‘Olyā) is a village in Qarah Quyun-e Jonubi Rural District, Qarah Quyun District, Showt County, West Azerbaijan Province, Iran. At the 2006 census, its population was 133, in 35 families.

References 

Populated places in Showt County